Penicillium cyaneum is a species of the genus of Penicillium which was isolated from an oil-field. Penicillium cyaneum produces fatty acid, Brefeldin A and the antibiotic Cyanein

See also
 List of Penicillium species

Further reading

References 

cyaneum
Fungi described in 1923